The Krasnoarmeysky constituency (No.47) is a Russian legislative constituency in Krasnodar Krai. The constituency covers western Krasnodar and its suburbs, as well as several rural districts in central Krasnodar Krai.

Members elected

Election results

1993

|-
! colspan=2 style="background-color:#E9E9E9;text-align:left;vertical-align:top;" |Candidate
! style="background-color:#E9E9E9;text-align:left;vertical-align:top;" |Party
! style="background-color:#E9E9E9;text-align:right;" |Votes
! style="background-color:#E9E9E9;text-align:right;" |%
|-
|style="background-color:"|
|align=left|Pyotr Kiriy
|align=left|Agrarian Party
|
|21.46%
|-
| colspan="5" style="background-color:#E9E9E9;"|
|- style="font-weight:bold"
| colspan="3" style="text-align:left;" | Total
| 
| 100%
|-
| colspan="5" style="background-color:#E9E9E9;"|
|- style="font-weight:bold"
| colspan="4" |Source:
|
|}

1995

|-
! colspan=2 style="background-color:#E9E9E9;text-align:left;vertical-align:top;" |Candidate
! style="background-color:#E9E9E9;text-align:left;vertical-align:top;" |Party
! style="background-color:#E9E9E9;text-align:right;" |Votes
! style="background-color:#E9E9E9;text-align:right;" |%
|-
|style="background-color:"|
|align=left|Yury Polyakov
|align=left|Power to the People!
|
|19.58%
|-
|style="background-color:"|
|align=left|Galina Doroshenko
|align=left|Our Home – Russia
|
|8.76%
|-
|style="background-color:"|
|align=left|Viktor Lebedintsev
|align=left|Independent
|
|7.33%
|-
|style="background-color:#FF4400"|
|align=left|Aleksandr Zabolotniy
|align=left|Party of Workers' Self-Government
|
|6.94%
|-
|style="background-color:#D50000"|
|align=left|Nina Shishkina
|align=left|Communists and Working Russia - for the Soviet Union
|
|6.83%
|-
|style="background-color:"|
|align=left|Pyotr Kiriy (incumbent)
|align=left|Agrarian Party
|
|6.17%
|-
|style="background-color:#2C299A"|
|align=left|Nikolay Gorovoy
|align=left|Congress of Russian Communities
|
|5.56%
|-
|style="background-color:"|
|align=left|Lyubov Bakhmetova
|align=left|Yabloko
|
|5.18%
|-
|style="background-color:"|
|align=left|Anatoly Medovnik
|align=left|Independent
|
|4.13%
|-
|style="background-color:"|
|align=left|Aleksandr Bondarenko
|align=left|Independent
|
|3.71%
|-
|style="background-color:"|
|align=left|Aleksey Anikin
|align=left|Independent
|
|3.32%
|-
|style="background-color:"|
|align=left|Viktor Shturba
|align=left|Independent
|
|3.04%
|-
|style="background-color:"|
|align=left|Viktor Kovalenko
|align=left|Liberal Democratic Party
|
|2.14%
|-
|style="background-color:"|
|align=left|Nikolay Galushko
|align=left|Kedr
|
|1.99%
|-
|style="background-color:"|
|align=left|Vladimir Serdyukov
|align=left|Independent
|
|1.60%
|-
|style="background-color:"|
|align=left|Georgy Ovchinnikov
|align=left|Independent
|
|1.34%
|-
|style="background-color:"|
|align=left|Vladimir Ilyin
|align=left|Independent
|
|0.88%
|-
|style="background-color:#F5821F"|
|align=left|Viktor Apalkov
|align=left|Bloc of Independents
|
|0.76%
|-
|style="background-color:"|
|align=left|Sergey Velichko
|align=left|Independent
|
|0.72%
|-
|style="background-color:"|
|align=left|Sergey Sergeyev
|align=left|Independent
|
|0.67%
|-
|style="background-color:"|
|align=left|Nikolay Berezhnoy
|align=left|Independent
|
|0.48%
|-
|style="background-color:#000000"|
|colspan=2 |against all
|
|6.86%
|-
| colspan="5" style="background-color:#E9E9E9;"|
|- style="font-weight:bold"
| colspan="3" style="text-align:left;" | Total
| 
| 100%
|-
| colspan="5" style="background-color:#E9E9E9;"|
|- style="font-weight:bold"
| colspan="4" |Source:
|
|}

1999

|-
! colspan=2 style="background-color:#E9E9E9;text-align:left;vertical-align:top;" |Candidate
! style="background-color:#E9E9E9;text-align:left;vertical-align:top;" |Party
! style="background-color:#E9E9E9;text-align:right;" |Votes
! style="background-color:#E9E9E9;text-align:right;" |%
|-
|style="background-color:"|
|align=left|Oleg Mashchenko
|align=left|Independent
|
|42.38%
|-
|style="background-color:"|
|align=left|Yevgeny Yegorov
|align=left|Independent
|
|11.14%
|-
|style="background-color:"|
|align=left|Pyotr Kiriy
|align=left|Independent
|
|9.50%
|-
|style="background-color:"|
|align=left|Sergey Medyanik
|align=left|Yabloko
|
|7.06%
|-
|style="background-color:"|
|align=left|Lyudmila Zaytseva
|align=left|Russian All-People's Union
|
|3.59%
|-
|style="background-color:"|
|align=left|Lyubov Alimova
|align=left|Our Home – Russia
|
|2.64%
|-
|style="background-color:"|
|align=left|Sergey Bogdanov
|align=left|Independent
|
|2.43%
|-
|style="background-color:#C62B55"|
|align=left|Aleksandr Zakharchenko
|align=left|Peace, Labour, May
|
|1.66%
|-
|style="background-color:"|
|align=left|Aleksandr Polyakov
|align=left|Independent
|
|1.43%
|-
|style="background-color:"|
|align=left|Vladimir Perebeynos
|align=left|Independent
|
|1.32%
|-
|style="background-color:#FCCA19"|
|align=left|Aleksandr Yelshin
|align=left|Congress of Russian Communities-Yury Boldyrev Movement
|
|1.18%
|-
|style="background-color:#020266"|
|align=left|Vasily Lyakh
|align=left|Russian Socialist Party
|
|1.16%
|-
|style="background-color:"|
|align=left|Vladimir Novolykin
|align=left|Independent
|
|1.07%
|-
|style="background-color:"|
|align=left|Vladimir Dimitrov
|align=left|Independent
|
|0.97%
|-
|style="background-color:"|
|align=left|Lyubov Shtangey
|align=left|Independent
|
|0.66%
|-
|style="background-color:#084284"|
|align=left|Vladimir Shapiro
|align=left|Spiritual Heritage
|
|0.62%
|-
|style="background-color:#000000"|
|colspan=2 |against all
|
|9.75%
|-
| colspan="5" style="background-color:#E9E9E9;"|
|- style="font-weight:bold"
| colspan="3" style="text-align:left;" | Total
| 
| 100%
|-
| colspan="5" style="background-color:#E9E9E9;"|
|- style="font-weight:bold"
| colspan="4" |Source:
|
|}

2003

|-
! colspan=2 style="background-color:#E9E9E9;text-align:left;vertical-align:top;" |Candidate
! style="background-color:#E9E9E9;text-align:left;vertical-align:top;" |Party
! style="background-color:#E9E9E9;text-align:right;" |Votes
! style="background-color:#E9E9E9;text-align:right;" |%
|-
|style="background-color:"|
|align=left|Vladimir Gorbachyov
|align=left|United Russia
|
|60.36%
|-
|style="background-color: " |
|align=left|Viktor Svetlov
|align=left|Communist Party
|
|13.34%
|-
|style="background-color: " |
|align=left|Anatoly Safronov
|align=left|Rodina
|
|4.98%
|-
|style="background-color: " |
|align=left|Lyubov Bakhmetova
|align=left|Yabloko
|
|4.81%
|-
|style="background-color:"|
|align=left|Nikolay Dyakov
|align=left|Liberal Democratic Party
|
|2.68%
|-
|style="background-color:"|
|align=left|Dmitry Gretsoy
|align=left|Independent
|
|1.28%
|-
|style="background-color:"|
|align=left|Vitaly Miroshnikov
|align=left|Independent
|
|0.54%
|-
|style="background-color:#164C8C"|
|align=left|Vladimir Lakeyev
|align=left|United Russian Party Rus'
|
|0.32%
|-
|style="background-color:#000000"|
|colspan=2 |against all
|
|10.17%
|-
| colspan="5" style="background-color:#E9E9E9;"|
|- style="font-weight:bold"
| colspan="3" style="text-align:left;" | Total
| 
| 100%
|-
| colspan="5" style="background-color:#E9E9E9;"|
|- style="font-weight:bold"
| colspan="4" |Source:
|
|}

2016

|-
! colspan=2 style="background-color:#E9E9E9;text-align:left;vertical-align:top;" |Candidate
! style="background-color:#E9E9E9;text-align:left;vertical-align:top;" |Party
! style="background-color:#E9E9E9;text-align:right;" |Votes
! style="background-color:#E9E9E9;text-align:right;" |%
|-
|style="background-color: " |
|align=left|Dmitry Lameykin
|align=left|United Russia
|
|53.71%
|-
|style="background-color:"|
|align=left|Sergey Luzinov
|align=left|Communist Party
|
|13.38%
|-
|style="background-color:"|
|align=left|Denis Kumpan
|align=left|Liberal Democratic Party
|
|10.58%
|-
|style="background-color:"|
|align=left|Denis Danilchenko
|align=left|A Just Russia
|
|5.01%
|-
|style="background-color:"|
|align=left|Denis Panasenko
|align=left|Rodina
|
|3.41%
|-
|style="background:"| 
|align=left|Natalya Ivanova
|align=left|Patriots of Russia
|
|3.31%
|-
|style="background:"| 
|align=left|Yury Yankin
|align=left|Communists of Russia
|
|2.71%
|-
|style="background-color:"|
|align=left|Georgy Kozmenko
|align=left|The Greens
|
|2.33%
|-
|style="background-color: "|
|align=left|Aleksandr Novikov
|align=left|Party of Growth
|
|2.03%
|-
|style="background-color:"|
|align=left|Georgy Zakharychev
|align=left|Civic Platform
|
|1.24%
|-
| colspan="5" style="background-color:#E9E9E9;"|
|- style="font-weight:bold"
| colspan="3" style="text-align:left;" | Total
| 
| 100%
|-
| colspan="5" style="background-color:#E9E9E9;"|
|- style="font-weight:bold"
| colspan="4" |Source:
|
|}

2021

|-
! colspan=2 style="background-color:#E9E9E9;text-align:left;vertical-align:top;" |Candidate
! style="background-color:#E9E9E9;text-align:left;vertical-align:top;" |Party
! style="background-color:#E9E9E9;text-align:right;" |Votes
! style="background-color:#E9E9E9;text-align:right;" |%
|-
|style="background-color: " |
|align=left|Dmitry Lameykin (incumbent)
|align=left|United Russia
|
|53.57%
|-
|style="background-color:"|
|align=left|Aleksandr Safronov
|align=left|Communist Party
|
|18.57%
|-
|style="background-color:"|
|align=left|Vladislav Kuznetsov
|align=left|A Just Russia — For Truth
|
|6.35%
|-
|style="background-color: " |
|align=left|Vitaly Katsko
|align=left|New People
|
|6.20%
|-
|style="background-color:"|
|align=left|Lyudmila Bazyleva
|align=left|Liberal Democratic Party
|
|4.84%
|-
|style="background-color: "|
|align=left|Andrey Safronov
|align=left|Party of Pensioners
|
|3.00%
|-
|style="background-color: "|
|align=left|Aleksey Todorenko
|align=left|Russian Party of Freedom and Justice
|
|1.77%
|-
|style="background-color: "|
|align=left|Kirill Guryev
|align=left|Yabloko
|
|1.31%
|-
|style="background-color:"|
|align=left|Roman Borisko
|align=left|Civic Platform
|
|1.19%
|-
|style="background-color: "|
|align=left|Viktoria Kurilenko
|align=left|Party of Growth
|
|1.12%
|-
| colspan="5" style="background-color:#E9E9E9;"|
|- style="font-weight:bold"
| colspan="3" style="text-align:left;" | Total
| 
| 100%
|-
| colspan="5" style="background-color:#E9E9E9;"|
|- style="font-weight:bold"
| colspan="4" |Source:
|
|}

Notes

References

Russian legislative constituencies
Politics of Krasnodar Krai